The following outline is provided as an overview of and topical guide to Laos:

Laos is a landlocked, sovereign nation in Southeast Asia. Laos borders Burma (Myanmar) and China to the northwest, Vietnam to the east, Cambodia to the south, and Thailand to the west. Laos traces its history to the Kingdom of Lan Xang or "Land of a Million Elephants", which existed from the fourteenth to the eighteenth century. After a period as a French protectorate, it gained independence in 1949. A long civil war ended officially when the communist Pathet Lao movement came to power in 1975, but strife between competing between factions continued for several years.

Private enterprise has increased since the late-1990s when economic reforms, including rapid business licensing, were introduced. Laos is still ranked low for economic and political freedom.  The economy of Laos grew at 6.89% in 2017, 35th fastest in the world. Eighty percent of the employed practice subsistence agriculture. The country's ethnic make-up is diverse, with around 70% belonging to the largest ethnic group, the Lao.

General reference 

 Pronunciation:
 Common English country name:  Laos
 Official English country name:  The Lao People's Democratic Republic
 Adjectives:  Lao, Laotian
 Demonym(s):
 Etymology: Name of Laos
 International rankings of Laos
 ISO country codes:  LA, LAO, 418
 ISO region codes:  See ISO 3166-2:LA
 Internet country code top-level domain:  .la

Geography of Laos 

Geography of Laos
 Laos is: a landlocked country
 Location:
 Northern Hemisphere and Eastern Hemisphere
 Eurasia
 Asia
 South East Asia
 Indochina
 Time zone:  ICT
 Extreme points of Laos
 High:  Phou Bia 
 Low:  Mekong 
 Land boundaries:  5,083 km
 2,130 km
 1,754 km
 541 km
 423 km
 235 km
 Coastline:  none
 Population of Laos: 7,275,560 (2020) (105th most populous country)

 Area of Laos: 230,800 km2 (89,112 mi2)
 Atlas of Laos

Environment of Laos 

 Climate of Laos
 Protected areas of Laos
 Wildlife of Laos
 Fauna of Laos
 Birds of Laos
 Mammals of Laos

Natural geographic features of Laos 

 Rivers of Laos
 World Heritage Sites in Laos: None

Regions of Laos

Ecoregions of Laos 

List of ecoregions in Laos

Administrative divisions of Laos 

Administrative divisions of Laos
 Provinces of Laos
 Districts of Laos

Provinces of Laos 

Provinces of Laos

Districts of Laos 

Districts of Laos

Municipalities of Laos 

 Capital of Laos: Vientiane
 Cities of Laos

Demography of Laos 

Demographics of Laos

Government and politics of Laos 

Politics of Laos
 Form of government:
 Capital of Laos: Vientiane
 Elections in Laos
 Political parties in Laos

Branches of the government of Laos 

Government of Laos

Executive branch of the government of Laos 
 Head of state: President of Laos,
 Head of government: Prime Minister of Laos,

Legislative branch of the government of Laos 

 Parliament of Laos (bicameral)
 Upper house: Senate of Laos
 Lower house: House of Commons of Laos

Judicial branch of the government of Laos 

Court system of Laos

Foreign relations of Laos 

Foreign relations of Laos
 Diplomatic missions in Laos
 Diplomatic missions of Laos
 Laos-Vietnam relations

International organization membership 
The Lao People's Democratic Republic is a member of:

Asian Development Bank (ADB)
Asia-Pacific Telecommunity (APT)
Association of Southeast Asian Nations (ASEAN)
Association of Southeast Asian Nations Regional Forum (ARF)
Colombo Plan (CP)
East Asia Summit (EAS)
Food and Agriculture Organization (FAO)
Group of 77 (G77)
International Bank for Reconstruction and Development (IBRD)
International Civil Aviation Organization (ICAO)
International Criminal Police Organization (Interpol)
International Development Association (IDA)
International Federation of Red Cross and Red Crescent Societies (IFRCS)
International Finance Corporation (IFC)
International Fund for Agricultural Development (IFAD)
International Labour Organization (ILO)
International Monetary Fund (IMF)
International Olympic Committee (IOC)
International Organization for Standardization (ISO) (subscriber)
International Red Cross and Red Crescent Movement (ICRM)

International Telecommunication Union (ITU)
Inter-Parliamentary Union (IPU)
Multilateral Investment Guarantee Agency (MIGA)
Nonaligned Movement (NAM)
Organisation internationale de la Francophonie (OIF)
Organisation for the Prohibition of Chemical Weapons (OPCW)
Permanent Court of Arbitration (PCA)
United Nations (UN)
United Nations Conference on Trade and Development (UNCTAD)
United Nations Educational, Scientific, and Cultural Organization (UNESCO)
United Nations Industrial Development Organization (UNIDO)
Universal Postal Union (UPU)
World Customs Organization (WCO)
World Federation of Trade Unions (WFTU)
World Health Organization (WHO)
World Intellectual Property Organization (WIPO)
World Meteorological Organization (WMO)
World Tourism Organization (UNWTO)
World Trade Organization (WTO) (observer)

Law and order in Laos 

Law of Laos
 Constitution of Laos
 Crime in Laos
 Human rights in Laos
 LGBT rights in Laos
 Freedom of religion in Laos
 Law enforcement in Laos

Military of Laos 

Military of Laos
 Command
 Commander-in-chief:
 Forces
 Army of Laos
 Navy of Laos: None
 Military history of Laos

Local government in Laos

History of Laos 

History of Laos
Timeline of the history of Laos
Current events of Laos
 Military history of Laos

Culture of Laos 

Culture of Laos
 Cuisine of Laos
 Festivals in Laos
 Languages of Laos
 List of museums in Laos
 National symbols of Laos
 Coat of arms of Laos
 Flag of Laos
 National anthem of Laos
 Lao people
 Prostitution in Laos
 Public holidays in Laos
 Religion in Laos
 Buddhism in Laos
 Christianity in Laos
 Hinduism in Laos
 Islam in Laos
 World Heritage Sites in Laos: None

Art in Laos 
 Literature of Laos
 Music of Laos
 Theatre in Laos

Sports in Laos 

Sports in Laos
 Football in Laos
 Laos at the Olympics

Economy and infrastructure of Laos 

Economy of Laos
 Economic rank, by nominal GDP (2007): 141st (one hundred and forty first)
 Agriculture in Laos
 Communications in Laos
 Internet in Laos
 Companies of Laos
Currency of Laos: Kip
ISO 4217: LAK
 Energy in Laos
 Tourism in Laos
 Transport in Laos
 Airports in Laos
 Rail transport in Laos

Education in Laos 

Education in Laos

Health in Laos 

Health in Laos

See also 

Laos
Index of Laos-related articles
List of international rankings
List of Laos-related topics
Member state of the United Nations
Outline of Asia
Outline of geography

References

External links 

 
 The National Portal of Laos
 Lao National Tourism Administration
 Lao Voices
 Lao Media
 
 Collaborative Collection of Creative Commons licensed images of Laos

.
 
Laos